Comaclinium is a genus in the family Asteraceae, described as a genus in 1852.

There is only one known species, Comaclinium montanum, native to Central America and to the State of Chiapas in southern Mexico.

References

Tageteae
Monotypic Asteraceae genera
Flora of Chiapas
Flora of Central America